The Georgian Times   is a Weekly newspaper published from Tbilisi, Georgia, in the English and Georgian languages. It was founded in 1993.

References

External links 
The Georgian Times Website

1993 establishments in Georgia (country)
Mass media in Tbilisi
Newspapers published in Georgia (country)
Publications established in 1993
Weekly newspapers